Roman Rynkiewicz (born November 17, 1981) is a Polish sprint canoer who has competed since the early 2000s. He won three medals at the ICF Canoe Sprint World Championships with a gold (C-4 1000 m: 2002) and two bronzes (C-1 4 × 200 m: 2010, C-4 1000 m: 2003).

Rynkiewicz also finished ninth in the C-2 500 m event at the 2008 Summer Olympics in Beijing.

References

Sports-Reference.com profile

1981 births
Canoeists at the 2008 Summer Olympics
Living people
Olympic canoeists of Poland
Polish male canoeists
People from Ciechanów
ICF Canoe Sprint World Championships medalists in Canadian
Sportspeople from Masovian Voivodeship